Yangite (PbMnSi3O8•H2O) is a chain-silicate mineral, first discovered within the Kombat mine in Namibia. The mineral is named after Hexiong Yang, a researcher within University of Arizona's Department of Geosciences. Yangite was approved as a valid mineral species by the International Mineralogical Association in 2012.

Occurrence
Yangite was initially found within a specimen taken from the Kombat mine, located in the Otavi Valley, Namibia. The specimen was obtained from John Innes, a senior mineralogist of the Tsumeb Corporation. Yangite occurs in an ore defined as an epithermal association. This ore type forms with narrow veins composed of galena, rhodochrosite, helvite, and barite.

Physical Properties
Yangite is colorless, ranging to pale brown when exposed to transmitted light. The mineral has a vitreous luster and streaks white. Yangite maintains a Mohs hardness of five, and demonstrates perfect cleavage along {101}. There is no evidence of twinning or parting within the available specimens. Yangite is sectile, commonly found with bladed or platy habit. The mineral is biaxial, elongated up to 12 mm in length along the [010] axis. Yangite is insoluble in several fluids, including water, acetone, and hydrochloric acid.

Chemical composition
Yangite has a consistent chemical composition, determined using a CAMECA SX100 electron microprobe. Additionally, the presence of H2O was confirmed using structural determination and Raman spectroscopic measurements.

Elemental Weight Percent:

X-ray crystallography
Yangite was analyzed by both powder and single-crystal X-ray diffraction. Data was collected using the Bruker X8 APEX2 CCD diffractometer. The diffraction data was influenced by severe peak overlap, leading to uncertainty in the resulting index.

Powder Diffraction Data:

Crystal structure
The chain silicate structure is formed by double wollastonite chains. These tetrahedral formations run parallel with the [010] axis and connect with Mn-polyhedra and Pb-polyhedra at the corners. The chains are also defined by four-membered and six-membered alternating tetrahedral rings. Yangite has three Si tetrahedral sites, defined as Si1, Si2, and Si3. Respectively, the average bond lengths are 1.622 Å, 1.622 Å, and 1.624 Å. Yangite is composed of an octahedrally coordinated Mn2+ cation. Within the crystal structure, Pb2+ has a coordination number of five, bonded with O molecules.

See also
List of minerals

References

Lead minerals
Manganese minerals
Inosilicates
Triclinic minerals
Hydrates
Minerals in space group 2